Marc Déry (born 4 November 1963) a French Canadian singer and guitarist from Quebec. He was a member of the band Zébulon. and also released four albums as a solo artist.

Early life
Déry was born in Mascouche, Quebec.

Career
Déry played bass for the band Les Colocs. In 1993, with his brother Yves, as well as Yves Marchand and Alain Quirion, he formed the band Zébulon. The group performed, recorded and toured until 1997.

In 1998, Déry began a solo career; his first solo album won him a Félix Award for arranger of the year. He then released two more solo albums before getting back together with his Zébulon bandmates to produce an album and conduct a follow-up tour in 2008.

Déry's fourth solo album, Numéro 4 was released in 2011 and was more pop-oriented than the others. He has toured extensively in Quebec.

Discography 
 Marc Déry (1999)
 À l'avenir (2002)
 À la figure (2005)
 Numéro 4 (2011)
Atterrissage (2019)

Videos 
 Le monde est rendu peace (1999)
 La cabane à Félix (2000)
 Ostie qu'y se lève tard (2003)
 À la figure (2005)
 20$ (2006)

References

External links 
 
 Quebec Info Musique: Marc Déry

1963 births
Audiogram (label) artists
Canadian male singers
Canadian rock singers
Canadian singer-songwriters
French Quebecers
Living people
Singers from Quebec
People from Mascouche
Félix Award winners
Canadian male singer-songwriters